Gompholobium pungens is a species of flowering plant in the family Fabaceae and is endemic to the south-west of Western Australia. It is an erect, openly-branched shrub with spiny stems, pinnate leaves and mostly yellow, pea-like flowers with pink or purple markings.

Description

Taxonomy
Gompholobium pungens was first formally described in 2008 by Jennifer Anne Chappill in Australian Systematic Botany from specimens collected near Warradarge in 1999. The specific epithet (pungens) means "ending in a sharp, hard point".

Distribution and habitat
This pea grows in lower valley slopes and on small rises in the Geraldton Sandplains, Jarrah Forest and Swan Coastal Plain biogeographic regions of south-western Western Australia.

Conservation status
Gompholobium pungens is classified as "not threatened" by the Western Australian Government Department of Parks and Wildlife.

References

pungens
Eudicots of Western Australia
Plants described in 2008